Marko Bačanin (born 9 July 1998 in Smederevo) is a Serbian professional footballer who plays as a forward for Napredak Kruševac.

Career

Club career
On 4 November 2016 Bačanin made his debut for Vojvodina, in 2:0 home win against Radnik Surdulica.

Personal life
Marko's twin brother, Strahinja Bačanin, is also a footballer.

References

1998 births
Living people
Sportspeople from Smederevo
Serbian footballers
Serbian expatriate footballers
FK Vojvodina players
FK Smederevo players
FK Jagodina players
AO Chania F.C. players
FK Javor Ivanjica players
FK Radnički Sombor players
FK Napredak Kruševac players
Slovenian Second League players
Serbian First League players
Serbian SuperLiga players
Association football forwards
Serbian expatriate sportspeople in Greece
Serbian expatriate sportspeople in Slovenia
Expatriate footballers in Greece
Expatriate footballers in Slovenia